Edwin Simcox (born January 12, 1945) is an American politician who served as the Secretary of State of Indiana from 1978 to 1986.

References

1945 births
Living people
Secretaries of State of Indiana
Indiana Republicans
People from La Porte, Indiana
2020 United States presidential electors